Íngrid Drexel Clouthier (born 28 July 1993) is a Mexican road bicycle racer, who last rode for UCI Women's Team .

Born in Monterrey, Nuevo León, Drexel competed at the 2012 Summer Olympics in the Women's road race, but finished outside the time limit. She is a representative of the Nuevo León cycling team.

Personal life
Drexel is married to Mexican footballer Gibrán Lajud, and the couple have one child – a son – born in 2020.

Major results

2010
 1st  Time trial, Pan American Junior Road Championships
2011
 3rd  Scratch, Pan American Track Championships
2012
 National Road Championships
1st  Time trial
1st  Road race
2013
 Pan American Road Championships
1st  Time trial
4th Road race
 National Road Championships
1st  Time trial
1st  Road race
 Copa Internacional de Pista
1st Points race
2nd Team pursuit (with Mayra Rocha, Ana María Hernandez and Erika Varela)
2014
 Central American and Caribbean Games
2nd  Team pursuit (with Jessica Bonilla, Mayra Rocha and Lizbeth Salazar)
6th Time trial
 National Road Championships
3rd Time trial
4th Road race
 Pan American Road Championships
6th Road race
7th Time trial
2015
 National Road Championships
1st  Time trial
2nd Road race
 1st Points race, Copa Cuba de Pista
 Pan American Games
3rd  Team pursuit (with Sofía Arreola, Mayra Rocha and Lizbeth Salazar)
6th Time trial
 5th Time trial, Pan American Road Championships
 7th Overall Vuelta Internacional Femenina a Costa Rica
2016
 2nd Overall Vuelta Internacional Femenina a Costa Rica
 2nd Copa Federación Venezolana de Ciclismo
 Pan American Road Championships
3rd  Time trial
4th Road race
 3rd Grand Prix de Venezuela
2017
 National Road Championships
1st  Time trial
1st  Road race
 7th Overall Joe Martin Stage Race
 8th Grand Prix Cycliste de Gatineau
 8th Winston-Salem Cycling Classic
 8th GP de Plouay – Bretagne
2018
 1st  Time trial, National Road Championships
 4th Grand Prix Cycliste de Gatineau

References

External links

Mexican female cyclists
1993 births
Living people
Olympic cyclists of Mexico
Cyclists at the 2012 Summer Olympics
Sportspeople from Monterrey
Cyclists at the 2015 Pan American Games
Cyclists at the 2010 Summer Youth Olympics
Pan American Games medalists in cycling
Pan American Games bronze medalists for Mexico
Medalists at the 2015 Pan American Games
21st-century Mexican women
20th-century Mexican women
Competitors at the 2014 Central American and Caribbean Games